Vundabar is an American indie rock band from Boston, Massachusetts. The band consists of Brandon Hagen (vocals, guitar), Drew McDonald (drums, synthesizer), and Zack Abramo (bass).

Vundabar released their first full-length album in 2013 titled Antics. In 2015, Vundabar released their second full-length album titled Gawk. In 2017, Vundabar performed at Boston Calling Music Festival. In February 2018, Vundabar released their third full-length album titled Smell Smoke which was recorded by Keith Abrams at Headroom Studios in Philadelphia. In March 2020, Vundabar released their fourth album Either Light. Vundabar released their fifth full-length album Devil for the Fire on 15 April 2022.
On September 16, 2022 they released their sixth full-length album Good Old, which consisted of 7 songs recorded in between the release of Gawk and Smell Smoke and 4 acoustic versions of previously released songs.

Band history

Vundabar formed when Brandon Hagen and Drew McDonald were in high school. Then the Bass player Zack Abramo joined the Band and in 2013 they released their debut full-length album titled Antics. Allmusic says they adopted a more gritty tone on their second album Gawk which added more post-punk to the mix. 

In mid 2016, A new member of the band was present in an interview. The former bassist, Zack Abramo, appeared to have left the band. The new bass player was named Greyson Kirtland. He continued to appear in Vundabar videos and interviews until late 2018, when the band tweeted about their next show, in which Abramo would be with them once more. 

In 2018 their third studio-album was released titled Smell Smoke. For their fourth album Either Light they changed their style and their way to write songs. Singer Brandon Hagen told in an interview with Allston Pudding that they wrote much of the songs on piano or synthesizer instead of guitar. The album featured jangle elements on a few songs and different instrumentation such as synths, vibraphone or acoustic guitar. In 2021 their song "Alien Blues" went viral on TikTok and has since been streamed over 240 million times on Spotify. In 2022 Vundabar released their fifth album titled Devil for the Fire and their sixth album, Good Old, was released in September of the same year.

Musical style

Their musical style is described as indie rock with elements of post-punk (Gawk and later albums), surf rock and jangle pop (Either Light and later albums). As influences, the band named Dick Dale, singer Brandon Hagen also named the Osees, bassist Zack Abramo named electronic music such as Burial, and drummer Drew McDonald named Tame Impala. On their first three albums, Vundabar mainly played their music on guitar, bass and drums. On their albums Either Light and Devil for the Fire, they also used synthesizers, electronic drum sounds and other instruments like piano or Omnichord.

Gawk Records

In an interview with Sound of Boston, McDonald explains that the band started a cassette label named Gawk Records in order to avoid financial pressures of signing to a label and to foster a community of artists.

Band members

Current
Brandon Hagen (vocals, guitar)
Zack Abramo (bass, background vocals)
Drew McDonald (drums, synthesizer)

Past
Greyson Kirtland (bass, background vocals)

Discography

Studio albums
Antics (2013)
Gawk (2015)
Smell Smoke (2018)
Either Light (2020)
Devil for the Fire (2022)

Compilation albums
Good Old (2022)

EPs
Vundabar on Audiotree Live (2017)

Singles
 "Vundabar" (2014)
"Shuffle" (2017)
"Acetone" (2017)
"Devil for the Fire" (2021)
"Alien Blues (Redux)" (2022)
"Time" (2022) 
"Shadow Boxing" (2022)

References

Musical groups from Boston
Musical groups established in 2012
2012 establishments in Massachusetts
Rock music groups from Massachusetts